The Co-operators Cup (also known as the Markdale Cashspiel) was a bonspiel part of the men's Ontario Curling Tour. The event was an annual event held in November and took place at the Markdale Curling Club in Markdale, Ontario.

Past Champions

References

External links
2012 Event Site

Ontario Curling Tour events
Grey County